Whitmarsh is a surname. Notable people with the name include:
Louis Whitmarsh, appellant of South Dakota Supreme Court case State v. Whitmarsh regarding fellatio
Martin Whitmarsh (born 1958), British businessman
Megan Whitmarsh (born 1972), American artist
Micah Whitmarsh, namesake of Col. Micah Whitmarsh House in Rhode Island, United States
Mike Whitmarsh (1962–2009), American volleyball and basketball player
Tim Whitmarsh, British classicist
Zach Whitmarsh (born 1977), Canadian track and field athlete